Alec Wallace (31 July 1881 – 30 June 1954) was an Australian rules footballer who played for the St Kilda Football Club and South Melbourne Football Club in the Victorian Football League (VFL).

References

External links 

1881 births
1954 deaths
Australian rules footballers from Victoria (Australia)
St Kilda Football Club players
Sydney Swans players